Many writers contributed to the large body of early Indian literature (here roughly taken to predate the 13th century Delhi Sultanate), consisting of poetry, drama, and writings on religion, philosophy, linguistics, mathematics and many other topics.

Literature

Grammar

Astrology

Medicine

Mathematics

See also 
 List of historic Indian texts
 Indian literature

External links 
 Sanskrit Works and Authors
 Mukherjee, Sujit (1999). A Dictionary of Indian Literature: Beginnings-1850 Orient Blackswan.

List
Ancient Indian writers